David Printz (born July 24, 1980 in Solna, Sweden) is a Swedish former professional ice hockey defenseman, who last played for Frölunda HC of the Swedish Hockey League (SHL).

Playing career

Printz is a product of the AIK youth system. He moved to the US for the 2000-01 season, joining AWHL side Great Falls Americans.

Back in his native Sweden, he played in 37 games for his hometown side AIK in the 2001-02 SHL season, before moving to Finland for the following campaign, splitting the season between Liiga clubs HPK and Ilves. In 2003-04, he returned to AIK, then playing in Sweden's second-tier league, the Allsvenskan.

Drafted 225th overall in the 2001 NHL Entry Draft by the Philadelphia Flyers, Printz came to North America prior to the 2004–05 AHL season. He played in 50 regular season games and 1 playoff game for the Calder Cup Champion Philadelphia Phantoms. The following season he played in 80 games for the Phantoms and played in his first NHL game after being called up late in the 2005–06 season. In 2006–07, he played 12 more games with the Flyers. Following the season, he signed with Djurgårdens IF, where he played until the end of the 2011-12 campaign.

Printz went to Slovakia for the 2012-13 season, joining KHL club HC Slovan Bratislava, for whom he played only one game before moving to Dornbirner EC of the EBEL for the remainder of the season.

He started the 2013-14 season with KalPa of Finland's Liiga, but transferred to Germany during the season, signing with the Nürnberg Ice Tigers of the top flight Deutsche Eishockey Liga.

Career statistics

Awards and honours

References

External links

 

1980 births
AIK IF players
Djurgårdens IF Hockey players
Dornbirn Bulldogs players
Frölunda HC players
HPK players
Ilves players
KalPa players
Karlskrona HK players
Living people
People from Solna Municipality
Philadelphia Flyers draft picks
Philadelphia Flyers players
Philadelphia Phantoms players
HC Slovan Bratislava players
Swedish ice hockey defencemen
Thomas Sabo Ice Tigers players
Timrå IK players
Trenton Titans players
Sportspeople from Stockholm County
Swedish expatriate ice hockey players in the United States
Swedish expatriate ice hockey players in Germany
Swedish expatriate ice hockey players in Finland
Swedish expatriate sportspeople in Slovakia
Swedish expatriate sportspeople in Austria
Expatriate ice hockey players in Austria
Expatriate ice hockey players in Slovakia